The Order of Constitutional Merit is a civil order of merit established by royal decree on 18 November 1988.  The order is granted those who have carried out activities in service of the Spanish Constitution and its values and established principles.  It may be granted to people and groups both public or private, Spanish or foreign.  Recipients are treated as an Excellency.

Appearance
The order has a distinctive oval medal, made of sterling silver with gold plating.  The obverse is the coat of arms of Spain on a blue background and the legend Constitutional Merit.  The badge of the Order of Constitutional Merit hangs from a silk ribbon equally divided in red and yellow parts.  The Medal of Constitutional Merit hangs from a twisted silk cord of red and yellow.  Groups and organizations are awarded a Plaque of Honor with the insignia of the order.

Notable recipients
Gloria Begué Cantón
Josep Borrell Fontelles
Tomás Caballero Pastor
Gabriel Cisneros
Eduardo Chillida
Rosa Díez
Carlos Martínez Gorriarán
Agustín Ibarrola
Jon Juaristi
Jaime Mayor Oreja
Gotzone Mora
Javier Pradera
Fernando Savater
José María Portillo Valdés
Pascual Sala
Pablo Pérez Tremps

References

External links
Orden de 22 de noviembre de 1988 por la que se aprueba el Reglamento de la Orden del Mérito Constitucional. 

1988 establishments in Spain
Orders of chivalry of Spain